Anka Butorac (1906? – January 19, 1942) was a Croatian communist who died in World War II and was proclaimed a People's Hero of Yugoslavia.

Anka Butorac was born in Lika, Croatia. She joined the Communist Party of Yugoslavia and the Partisans and was killed by the Croatian fascist Ustasha in Kostajnica.

Sources 
 Narodni heroji Jugoslavije (National heroes of Yugoslavia). „Mladost“, Belgrade 1975.
 Heroine Jugoslavije (Heroines of Yugoslavia). „Spektar“, Zagreb 1980.

1900s births
1942 deaths
Croatian people of World War II
Women in the Yugoslav Partisans
Yugoslav communists
Yugoslav Partisans members
Recipients of the Order of the People's Hero
Yugoslav military personnel killed in World War II